Philippe Gladines (born August 19, 1960 in Aurillac, France) is a former professional footballer who played as a striker. He was a member of the French squad that won a silver medal at the 1987 Mediterranean Games.

External links
Philippe Gladines profile at chamoisfc79.fr

1960 births
Living people
French footballers
Association football forwards
FC Metz players
Louhans-Cuiseaux FC players
Chamois Niortais F.C. players
Valenciennes FC players
La Roche VF players
Ligue 2 players
Competitors at the 1987 Mediterranean Games
Mediterranean Games silver medalists for France
Mediterranean Games medalists in football
People from Aurillac
Sportspeople from Cantal
Footballers from Auvergne-Rhône-Alpes